
This is a list of past and present members of the Académie des Beaux-Arts in section V: Musical composition.

Seat #1 

 elected 1795: Étienne Nicolas Méhul (1763–1817)
 1817: François-Adrien Boïeldieu (1776–1834)
 1835: Antoine Reicha (1770–1836)
 1836: Jacques Fromental Halévy (1799–1862)
 1854: Louis Clapisson (1808–1866)
 1866: Charles Gounod (1818–1893)
 1894: Théodore Dubois (1837–1924)
 1924: Gabriel Pierné (1863–1937)
 1938: Henri Busser (1872–1973)
 1975: Marcel Landowski (1915–1999)
 2000: Laurent Petitgirard (born 1950)

Seat #2 

 1795: François-Joseph Gossec (1733–1829)
 1829: Daniel Auber (1782–1871)
 1872: Victor Massé (1822–1884)
 1884: Léo Delibes (1836–1891)
 1891: Ernest Guiraud (1837–1892)
 1892: Émile Paladilhe (1844–1926)
 1926: André Messager (1853–1929)
 1929: Alfred Bachelet (1864–1944)
 1945: Reynaldo Hahn (1875–1947)
 1947: Marcel Samuel-Rousseau (1882–1955)
 1956: Marcel Dupré (1886–1971)
 1972: Darius Milhaud (1892–1974)
 1975: Henri Sauguet (1901–1989)
 1990: Jean Prodromidès (1927–2016)
 2017: Bruno Mantovani (born 1974)

Seat #3 

 1795: André Grétry (1741–1813)
 1813: Pierre-Alexandre Monsigny (1773–1817)
 1817: Charles Simon Catel (1773–1830)
 1831: Ferdinando Paër (1772–1839)
 1839: Gaspare Spontini (1779–1851)
 1851: Ambroise Thomas (1811–1896)
 1896: Charles Lenepveu (1840–1910)
 1910: Charles-Marie Widor (1844–1937)
 1918: Henri Rabaud (1873–1949)
 1950: Paul Paray (1886–1979)
 1980: Raymond Gallois-Montbrun (1918–1994)
 1995: Jean-Louis Florentz (1947–2004)
 2009: Michaël Levinas (born 1949)

Seat #4 

 1796: Grandmesnil (Jean-Baptiste Fauchard, 1737–1816)
 1816: Henri Montan Berton (1767–1844)
 1844: Adolphe Adam (1803–1856)
 1856: Hector Berlioz (1803–1869)
 1869: Félicien David (1810–1897)
 1876: Ernest Reyer (1823–1909)
 1909: Gabriel Fauré (1845–1924)
 1925: Alfred Bruneau (1857–1934)
 1934: Paul Dukas (1865–1935)
 1936: Florent Schmitt (1870–1958)
 1959: Emmanuel Bondeville (1898–1987)
 1989: Serge Nigg (1924–2008)
 2013: Gilbert Amy (born 1936)

Seat #5 

 1815: Luigi Cherubini (1760–1842)
 1842: George Onslow (1784–1853)
 1853: Napoléon Henri Reber (1807–1880)
 1881: Camille Saint-Saëns (1835–1921)
 1922: Georges Hüe (1858–1948)
 1949: Guy Ropartz (1864–1955)
 1956: Jacques Ibert (1890–1962)
 1962: Georges Auric (1899–1983)
 1983: Iannis Xenakis (1921–2001)
 2002: François-Bernard Mâche (born 1935)

Seat #6 

 1815: Jean-François Lesueur (1760–1834)
 1837: Michele Carafa (1787–1872)
 1873: François Bazin (1816–1878)
 1878: Jules Massenet (1842–1912)
 1912: Gustave Charpentier (1860–1956)
 1956: Louis Aubert (1877–1968)
 1969: Tony Aubin (1907–1981)
 1982: Jean-Yves Daniel-Lesur (1908–2002)
 2005: Édith Canat de Chizy (born 1950)

Seat #7 

 1967: Olivier Messiaen (1908–1992)
 1992: Marius Constant (1925–2004)
 2005: Charles Chaynes (1925–2016)
 2016: Régis Campo (born 1968)

Seat #8 
 1999: Charles Trenet (1913–2001)
 2001:  (1946–2012)
 2013: Thierry Escaich (born 1965)

Sources
 List of members @ the Académie des Beaux-Arts website.

See also
List of Académie des Beaux-Arts members: Painting
List of Académie des Beaux-Arts members: Sculpture
List of Académie des Beaux-Arts members: Architecture
List of Académie des Beaux-Arts members: Engraving
List of Académie des Beaux-Arts members: Unattached
List of Académie des Beaux-Arts members: Cinema

 Music
French composers
Lists of French people
Lists of composers